Didier Beugnies (born 14 March 1961) is a Belgian former professional footballer and later manager.

Club career
Beugnies began his professional career at Mons during the 1983–84 Belgian First Division, before joining Charleroi the following season, where he played eight seasons. Reaching promotion with Charleroi from the second tier, he became the top goalscorer of the division with 23 goals in the 1984–85 seasons. During his second season with Les Zèbres, in the 1985–86 season, he scored 22 goals and finished second in the race for the golden boot, behind Erwin Vandenbergh and ahead of Jean-Pierre Papin.

He continued his career with a return for a season at Mons, before retiring from football as part of Namur in 1994 at the age of 33.

International career
In 1986, Beugnies was called up for the Belgium squad for the qualification for the 1988 Summer Olympics, for which they eventually failed to qualify. He made three appearances in which he scored one goal.

Managerial career
Beugnies returned to the world of football by coaching the youth teams of Charleroi from 2001 to 2009. He was the manager of RWDM Brussels during three short periods between 2012 and 2014, then the final coach of Mons as the club filed for bankruptcy in 2015.

References

1961 births
Living people
Belgian footballers
R.A.E.C. Mons players
R. Charleroi S.C. players
Union Royale Namur Fosses-La-Ville players
Belgian Pro League players
Challenger Pro League players
Association football forwards
Belgian football managers
R.W.D.M. Brussels F.C. managers
R.A.E.C. Mons managers
Belgium under-21 international footballers
People from Frameries
Footballers from Hainaut (province)